Sir John Tyrrell (c.1382 – 2 April 1437), of Heron in the Essex parish of East Horndon, was an English landowner, lawyer, administrator, and politician who was chosen three times as Speaker of the House of Commons.

Origins
John Tyrrell was the eldest son of Walter Tyrrell of Avon Tyrrell, Hampshire, by his wife Eleanor Flambard (died 29 March 1422), daughter and heiress of Edmund Flambard of Shepreth, Cambridgeshire, by his wife Elizabeth FitzRalph, daughter of Richard FitzRalph. After the death of Walter Tyrrell, Eleanor remarried to Sir Nicholas Haute (1357–c. 1415), MP, of Wadden Hall in Waltham, Kent.
 
John was the grandson and heir of Sir Thomas Tyrrell (died 1382) who was buried at Downham, Essex, in 1382, and was survived by his wife, Alice.

Brothers
Tyrrell had the following four brothers:
Edward Tyrrell (died 17 December 1442), Esquire, of Downham, who married Anne Pashley, widow of John Bassingbourne and daughter of Sir Robert Pashley by his wife Philippe Sergeaux (sister-in-law of Richard de Vere, 11th Earl of Oxford). By his wife Anne, Edward Tyrrell had the following progeny:
Edward Tyrrell, who died without issue.
Philippe Tyrrell, daughter, who married, before 1446–7, Thomas Cornwallis (died 26 May 1484) of Brome, Suffolk, by whom she had four sons and a daughter.
Margaret Tyrrell, who married Robert Mounteney.
He also had
John Tyrrell, illegitimate son.
Richard Tyrrell; 
Thomas Tyrrell;
William Tyrrell, who died before 1442.

Sisters
He probably also had a sister:
Elizabeth Tyrrell, who married, as his second wife, Sir William Lisle (died 1442), an illegitimate son of Robert Lisle, 3rd Baron Lisle (died 1399).

Career
John Tyrrell was appointed High Sheriff of Essex and Hertfordshire in 1413 and again in 1423. He was elected knight of the shire for Essex 12 times between 1411 and 1437 and once for Hertfordshire in 1427. He was elected Speaker of the House of Commons three times, in 1421, 1429 and 1437.

In 1427 he was appointed steward of Clare in Suffolk and Thaxted in Essex, during the minority of Richard of York, 3rd Duke of York, and chief steward of the Duchy of Lancaster north of Trent. He was a member of King Henry VI's council in France in 1431. He was knighted in 1431 and in May of that year was appointed Treasurer of the Royal Household, a post he held until his death.

Marriages and issue

First marriage
Tyrrell married firstly, at some time  before 1411, Alice Coggeshall (died 1422), daughter and co-heiress of Sir William Coggeshall by his wife Antiocha Hawkwood, daughter and heiress of Sir John Hawkwood, by whom he had five surviving sons and four daughters, including:

Sir Thomas Tyrrell (c. 1411 – 28 March 1477) of Heron, eldest son and heir not only to his father but also to his uncle Edward Tyrrell (died 1442). He married  Anne Marney, daughter of Sir William Marney (died 21 or 24 August 1414) by his wife Elizabeth Sergeaux, by whom he had four sons and two daughters: 
Sir William Tyrrell, slain at the Battle of Barnet in 1471, who married firstly Eleanor Darcy, by whom he had a son, Sir Thomas Tyrrell (c. 1453–1512). He married secondly to Eleanor Hungerford; 
Humphrey Tyrrell (died c. 1507), Esquire, who married firstly Isabel Helion, and secondly Elizabeth Walwin; 
Sir Robert Tyrrell (died 1508), who married firstly Christian Hartshorn, and secondly to a certain Elizabeth, whose surname is unknown.
Thomas Tyrrell (died 26 March 1476), esquire, who married Elizabeth Bruyn (died March 1494), who later remarried to Sir William Brandon (d.1485), by whom she was the mother of Charles Brandon, 1st Duke of Suffolk.
Anne Tyrrell, who married John Darcy
Elizabeth Tyrrell (died after 1487), who married firstly Sir Robert Darcy (died 2 November 1469), and secondly, Richard Haute (died 8 April 1487), Esquire.
William Tyrrell of Gipping, Suffolk, beheaded on Tower Hill 23 February 1462, who married Margaret Darcy, by whom he was the father of Sir James Tyrrell.
William Tyrrell (died c. 1471) of Beeches in Rawreth, Essex, who married firstly Anne Fitz Simon, the daughter of Robert Fitz Simon, and secondly Philippa Thornbury, the daughter of John Thornbury.
Alice Tyrrell (died 1460), who married firstly  Hamo Strange, secondly William Skrene the younger (died 1431), eldest son of William Skrene, Chief Baron of the Irish Exchequer, and thirdly Thomas Pigot, and had a son, John Skrene (died 1452), by her second husband.

Second marriage
He married secondly, at some time before 1427, Katherine Burgate (died after 1436), the widow successively of Robert Stonham (died 1397), of Stonham Aspal, Suffolk, and John Spencer (died 1417), of Banham, Norfolk, and daughter and co-heiress of Sir William Burgate (died 24 July 1409) of Burgate, Suffolk, by his wife Eleanor Visdelou, daughter of Sir Thomas Visdelou, by whom he had a daughter.

References

Sources

 

 

Wedgwood's History of Parliament vol. 1 (1936).

External links
Will of Sir Thomas Tyrrell of Essex, proved 11 June 1477, PROB 11/6/417, National Archives Retrieved 19 June 2013
Will of Humphrey Tyrrell of East Thornton, Essex, proved 14 October 1507, PROB 11/15/580, National Archives Retrieved 20 July 2013
Coggeshall, Sir William (1358–1426), of Codham Hall and Coggeshall, Essex, History of Parliament Retrieved 20 July 2013
Haute, William (d.1462), of Bishopsbourne, Kent, History of Parliament Retrieved 20 July 2013
Darcy, Robert (d.1448), of Maldon, Essex, History of Parliament Retrieved 20 July 2013

1380s births
1437 deaths
Year of birth uncertain
Speakers of the House of Commons of England
High Sheriffs of Essex
High Sheriffs of Hertfordshire
People from the Borough of Brentwood
English MPs 1411
English MPs May 1421
English MPs 1427
English MPs 1429
English MPs 1437
Members of the Parliament of England for Hertfordshire
Burials at Austin Friars, London
Knights Bachelor